Jarogniew Wojciechowski (5 November 1922 - 24 August 1942) was a student of the Salesian Oratory in Poznań and one of the Poznań Five resistance fighters. In church he was an altar boy and sang in the choir. He was active in the Military Organization of the Western Territories (Wojskowa Organizacja Ziem Zachodnich) and participated in the Battle of the Bzura. He was arrested by the Gestapo in September 1940 and guillotined in a prison in Dresdent on 24 August 1942 along with his friends. In 1999, he was beatified as one of the 108 Blessed Polish Martyrs.

References 

1922 births
1942 deaths
108 Blessed Polish Martyrs
Polish resistance members of World War II
People executed by Nazi Germany by guillotine